Dositej Vasić (Serbian Cyrillic: Доситеј Васић; 5 December 1878 – 13 January 1945) was the first Serbian Orthodox Metropolitan of Zagreb and a victim of the genocide of Serbs in the Independent State of Croatia.

Biography
Dragutin Vasić was born on 5 December 1887 in Belgrade. He graduated and acquired the master's degree in 1904 at the Kiev Theological Academy. After that, he finished philosophy at the universities of Berlin and Leipzig.

The Holy Synod of the Serbian Orthodox Church elected him the bishop of Niš in May 1913. During the Great War he did not want to leave Niš, so the enemy found him in his residence and interned him as a prisoner of war. Immediately after that, 150 priests were brutally slaughtered. He returned from the internment camp to his Eparchy in 1918. He was Bishop of Transcarpathia and vice-president of the Holy Synod and took part in the negotiations with the Patriarchate of Constantinople about the re-establishment of the Serbian Patriarchate in 1920. Upon the establishment of Zagreb Bishopric, the bishop-martyr Dositej was ordained its first metropolitan.

He died on 13 January 1945 as a consequence of the brutal torture he had suffered in Zagreb prison, in which Roman Catholic nuns participated as well. He was buried in the churchyard of the Serbian Orthodox Monastery of the Presentation of the Blessed Virgin in Belgrade or Manastir Vavedenja Presvete Bogorodice in Belgrade.

References 

1878 births
1945 deaths
Clergy from Belgrade
Serbian Orthodox clergy
20th-century Eastern Orthodox bishops
Bishops of the Serbian Orthodox Church
Serbian torture victims
Burials at Serbian Orthodox monasteries and churches
Serbs of Croatia
Metropolitanate of Zagreb and Ljubljana